Jonathan Edward Russell (born 9 October 2000) is an English professional footballer who plays for Barnsley, as a midfielder.

Club career
Born in Hounslow, Russell joined Chelsea at under-7 level. He turned professional in October 2017. He moved on loan to Accrington Stanley in October 2020. He moved to Huddersfield Town in July 2021. He scored his first goal for the club on 23 February 2022 when he scored a late winner in a 2–1 win against Cardiff City.

On 31 January 2023, Russell joined EFL League One side Barnsley for an undisclosed fee.

International career
On 13 September 2022, Russell was called up by the Jamaica national football team.

Style of play
He has been described as "a very tall box-to-box midfield player who can also play as a number 10 and has a great eye for a pass".

Personal life
Russell is a member of the Church of Jesus Christ of Latter-day Saints.

Career statistics

References

2000 births
Living people
English footballers
English sportspeople of Jamaican descent
Chelsea F.C. players
Accrington Stanley F.C. players
Huddersfield Town A.F.C. players
Barnsley F.C. players
English Football League players
Association football midfielders
The Church of Jesus Christ of Latter-day Saints members